Timothy D. "Tim" Skinner is a former teacher and a Democratic politician in Indiana who served three terms in the Indiana Senate.

Skinner earned his B.A. and M.A. in Secondary Education from Indiana State University. He taught economics, government, and geography at West Vigo High School in West Terre Haute until his retirement in 2011.

Skinner represented the 38th Senate District from 2002 to 2014, when he lost to Jon Ford in the general election. He was the 2016 Democratic nominee for the Indiana House of Representatives, District 42. He lost to the incumbent, Alan Morrison. Previously an Otter Creek Township, Vigo County, Indiana Precinct Committeeman, he also has served on the Vigo County Council (1999-2004).

External links
 Tim Skinner for House campaign web site

References

Democratic Party Indiana state senators
Living people
Year of birth missing (living people)